Saleha binti Mohamed Alam (born 7 October 1946) is the Queen of Brunei as the wife of Sultan Hassanal Bolkiah, the current Sultan of Brunei. She is the daughter of Pengiran Pemancha Pengiran Anak Haji Mohammad Alam and Pengiran Anak Hajah Besar. After her husband was crowned as the Sultan and Yang Di-Pertuan of Brunei, she succeeded her mother-in-law, Pengiran Anak Damit, as Raja Isteri (Queen consort). She is the mother of Crown Prince Al-Muhtadee Billah.

Early life
Saleha was born at Kampong Sumbiling, Jalan Istana Darussalam in Brunei Town (now Bandar Seri Begawan), Brunei Darussalam on 7 October 1946. Her name, Saleha, means "pious" or "virtuous" in Arabic.

Saleha had her early education through private tuition at the surau (a large prayer hall) of Istana Darul Hana. She also attended religious classes. She furthered her secondary education at Sekolah Tinggi Perempuan Raja Isteri (STPRI) in Bandar Seri Begawan until 1965.

When Saleha was young she sometimes did not wear a veil.

Saleha also attended Cygnets House, a finishing school for young ladies in South Kensington, SW7 along with her sister-in-law Princess Masna Bolkiah, while her husband the Sultan and his brother were at Sandhurst.

Marriage and family life
On 28 July 1965, Saleha married her paternal first cousin, Pengiran Muda Mahkota (Crown Prince) Hassanal Bolkiah, who later became the 29th Sultan of Brunei. The sultan's mother Raja Isteri (Queen Consort) Pengiran Anak Damit and Saleha's father Pengiran Anak Mohammad Alam were siblings.

Saleha has two sons and four daughters. She has eighteen grandchildren (five from her daughter Princess Rashidah, four from her son Crown Prince Billah, two from her daughter Princess Majeedah, four from her daughter Princess Hafizah and three from her son Prince Abdul Malik), and her elder son is Crown Prince Al-Muhtadee Billah.

Social contributions

Saleha is the Patron to various organisations including the Women's Institute (WI), Pertiwi Association, PEKERTI, the Girl Guides Association of Brunei Darussalam, the Brunei Government Senior Officers Wives Welfare Association (BISTARI), the Women's Council of Brunei Darussalam, The Women Graduates' Association, and the Brunei Shell Women Association.

Hobbies and interests
Being a lover of nature, Saleha has a fruit garden, a fish pond and a bird park. Her hobbies include reading, playing badminton as well as traditional Bruneian games such as Congkak and Pasang.

Honours 

She has been awarded :

National honours
  Royal Family Order of the Crown of Brunei - Darjah Kerabat Mahkota Brunei - D.K.M.B.
  Family Order of Laila Utama 1st Class - Darjah Kerabat Laila Utama Yang Amat Dihormati - D.K.
  Pingat Hassanal Bolkiah Sultan (Sultan Hassanal Bolkiah Medal - PHBS, 1 August 1968).
  Sultan of Brunei Silver Jubilee Medal (5 October 1992).
  Sultan of Brunei Golden Jubilee Medal (5 October 2017).

Foreign honours
 :
 Dame Grand Cordon of the Supreme Order of the Renaissance, Special Class
 :
 Honorary Dame Grand Cordon of the Order of the Crown of the Realm
 :
 Dame Grand Cross of the Royal Family Order of Kelantan
 :
 Dame Grand Cross of the Order of the Netherlands Lion
 :
 Member of the Royal Order of the Seraphim
 Commander Grand Cross Royal Order of the Polar Star
 :
 Dame Grand Cordon with Chain of the Order of Chula Chom Klao, Special Class
 :
 Member of the Decoration of Princess Olga, 1st Class
 :
 Star of Mahaputera 1st Class
 :
 Grand Order of Mugunghwa

Children

Ancestry

See also
 Raja Isteri Pengiran Anak Saleha Hospital
 Raja Isteri Pengiran Anak Hajah Saleha Bridge
 Raja Isteri Pengiran Anak Saleha Secondary School

References

External links

1946 births
Living people
Bruneian Muslims
Bruneian royalty
Queens consort
Bruneian women
Dames Grand Cross of the Order of Chula Chom Klao
Recipients of the Order of Princess Olga, 1st class